Central University of Kerala (CUK)  is one of the 15 central universities established under The Central Universities Act, 2009 (Act No.25 of 2009) by the Parliament of India. The university is seated in Kasaragod, the northernmost district of the Indian state of Kerala. The main campus of the university is situated at Periya, 9.8 km from Kanhangad and 20 km south from Kasaragod towns. The university initially started functioning from a transit campus in Vidyanagar with its humanities schools and other amenities.

Organisation and administration

Schools and departments
School of Biological Sciences
 Department of Biochemistry and Molecular Biology
Department of Genomic Science
Department of Plant Science
Department of Zoology
School of Business Studies
Department of Commerce & International Business
Department of Management Studies
Department of Tourism Studies
School of Cultural Studies
Mahathma Ayyankali Centre for Kerala Studies
School of Earth Science Systems
Department of Environmental Science
Department of Geology
School of Economics
Department of Economics
School of Education
Department of Education
E Sreedharan Centre for Life Skills Education
School of Global Studies
Department of International Relations (Capital Centre, Trivandrum)
Department of International Relations and Politics
School of Languages and Comparative Literatures
Department of English and Comparative Literature
Department of Hindi
Department of Kannada
Department of Linguistics
Department of Malayalam
School of Legal Studies
Department of Law (Thiruvalla campus)
School of Medicine and Public Health
Department of Public Health and Community Medicine
Department of Yoga
School of Physical Sciences
Department of Chemistry
Department of Computer Science
Department of Mathematics
Department of Physics
School of Social Sciences
Department of Public Administration and Policy Studies
Department of Social Work

Academics

Academic programmes

Postgraduate programs
The duration of the postgraduate programme is 4 semesters. Each semester has a duration of 16–18 weeks, with 5 working days and 30 instructional hours per week.

The programmes are organised under Choice Based Credit and Semester (CBCS) pattern. Students are offered two types of courses:
 Core courses, identified by each department, providing a broad base in the subject of study;
 Elective courses, chosen by the students in consultation with the Faculty Advisor.

In addition to these, each student does a Dissertation/Project emphasising the application of knowledge to real problems. The minimum total credits required for the successful completion of a PG programme is 72 credits within 4 semesters. Out of the 72 credits, a student has to secure a minimum of 48 but not more than 60 credits, including that of the Dissertation for Core courses, and a minimum of 12 but not more than 24 credits for Elective courses.

Ph.D programme
All the departments of the university offers Ph.D. programmes.
KILA is the research center of International Relations & Political Science

Rankings

Student life

Cankama
Cankama- The Art Festival of CUK is the most important cultural event of campus which consist of three days of competitions where students compete under each school. Cankama was started in 2015 by then students council and ever since this stands as the most important event of CUK students' life.

Scholarships/Financial Support
CUK offers scholarships to its PG Students. It stands to be withdrawn from the 2017 academic year onwards despite student protest.

Hostel Facility
Limited seats in separate hostels for girls and boys are available.

Transportation Facility
Transport is available to all students from their hostels to the university campuses at subsidised rates.

University Library
Central University has libraries at all of its campuses.

Students’ Council
The Students’ Council is a student body comprising 40 student representatives of which 20 members are elected and 20 members are nominated representing the departments. The council also has an executive committee composed of 10 members. The President, two Vice Presidents, the General Secretary, two Joint Secretaries and four Executive Committee Members are the office bearers of the Students’ Council.

References

External links
 Official website

Education in Kasaragod
Central universities in India
Universities in Kerala
2009 establishments in Kerala
Educational institutions established in 2009
Universities and colleges in Kasaragod district